The striped-tailed delma or single-striped delma (Delma labialis) is a species of lizard in the Pygopodidae family endemic to Australia.

References

Pygopodids of Australia
Delma
Vulnerable fauna of Australia
Reptiles described in 1987
Taxonomy articles created by Polbot